The UNTV Cup Executive Face Off was the 2017 off-season tournament of the annual charity basketball league in the Philippines, UNTV Cup. The tournament is organized by UNTV Public Service channel, through its chairman and chief executive officer of BMPI-UNTV, Kuya Daniel Razon, more popularly known as Mr. Public Service.

It officially opened on May 21, 2017 at the Pasig City Sports Complex, Pasig. Six teams vied for the championship title of the season. Regular games were held at the same venue with a live telecast on the UNTV Public Service channel every Sunday afternoon.

The championship game was held on July 10, 2017 at the Smart Araneta Coliseum in Quezon City. The AFP Cavaliers outlasted the PNP Responders in overtime, 75–70, to claim the inaugural Executive Face Off title.

Teams
There are 6 squads who vied for the championship title of the season. All are returning teams, led by Season 5 champions PNP Responders.

Elimination round

Exhibition Game: Ex-Pro Team vs. UNTV Cup Selection 

On July 10, 2017 at the Smart Araneta Coliseum, members of the Samahan ng mga Dating Propesyonal na Basketbolista ng Pilipinas face the UNTV Cup selection for an exhibition game as part of the festivities during the UNTV Cup Executive Face-Off Finals.

One million pesos was given to the newly-established Samahan ng mga Dating Propesyonal na Baskebolista sa Pilipinas Foundation for the benefit of former basketball professionals from 1975 to 1990 in need of medical assistance.

Executive Face Off Finals: (1) AFP Cavaliers vs. (2) PNP Responders

Winners and Beneficiaries

A total of 2.15 million pesos tax-free was be given to the teams' chosen beneficiaries, with the champion taking home a trophy and 1 million pesos to be given to their chosen charity institution. The runner-up's beneficiary will receive 500 thousand pesos, while 250 thousand  and 200 thousand pesos will be given to third and fourth-place finishers' chosen charities, respectively. The other participating teams will get 100 thousand pesos for their beneficiary.

See also 
 UNTV Cup

References

External links 
 UNTVweb.com

Members Church of God International
2017 Philippine television series debuts
2017 in Philippine sport
UNTV Cup
UNTV (Philippines) original programming